The 2010 Philippine presidential and vice presidential elections were held on Monday, May 10, 2010. The ruling President of the Philippines, Gloria Macapagal Arroyo, was ineligible to seek re-election as per the 1987 Constitution, thus necessitating an election to select the 15th President.

Incumbent Vice-President Noli de Castro was allowed to seek re-election, though he could have possibly sought the presidency. As he didn't offer himself in any manner of candidacy at the election, his successor was determined as the 13th  Vice President of the Philippines. Although most presidential candidates have running mates, the president and vice president are elected separately, and the winning candidates may be of different political parties.

This election was also the first time that the Commission of Elections (COMELEC) implemented full automation of elections, pursuant to Republic Act 9369, "An Act Authorizing The Commission on Elections To Use An Automated Election System In The May 11, 1998 National or Local Elections and In Subsequent National And Local Electoral Exercises".

The results of the congressional canvassing showed that Senator Benigno Aquino III of the Liberal Party won by a plurality, although he had won with the highest percentage of votes since 1986, but not enough to have the largest margin of victory, even in elections held after 1986.

Meanwhile, in the election for the vice-presidency, Makati Mayor Jejomar Binay of the Partido Demokratiko Pilipino-Lakas ng Bayan (PDP-Laban) defeated Senator Mar Roxas of the Liberal Party in the third-narrowest margin in the history of vice presidential elections. Aquino and Binay were proclaimed in a joint session of Congress on June 9, and took their oaths on June 30, 2010. Roxas filed an electoral protest to the Presidential Electoral Tribunal (PET; the Supreme Court) on July 10, 2010.

Electoral system 
The election is held every six years after 1992, on the second Monday of May. The incumbent president is term limited. The incumbent vice president may run for two consecutive terms. As Joseph Estrada, who was elected in 1998, was able to run in 2010, it is undetermined if the term limit is for life, or is only limited to the incumbent.

The plurality voting system is used to determine the winner: the candidate with the highest number of votes, whether or not one has a majority, wins the presidency. The vice presidential election is a separate election, is held on the same rules, and voters may split their ticket. Both winners will serve six-year terms commencing on the noon of June 30, 2010 and ending on the same day six years later.

The candidates are determined via political conventions of the different political parties. As most political parties in the Philippines are loosely structured, with most politicians switching parties from time to time, a person not nominated by a party may either run as an independent, get drafted by another party, or form their own party. The candidacy process is supervised by the Commission on Elections (usually referred by its abbreviation "COMELEC") which also regulates and holds the elections. It is not uncommon for the commission to disqualify certain candidates as "nuisance candidates" or those candidates who have no capacity to mount a nationwide campaign. This usually limits the candidates to a small number. The campaign will run for three months, beginning in early February 2010 and ending on the eve of the election. 

The counting of votes is initially held in the individual voting precincts, which are all then tabulated for the different municipalities and cities, then to the provinces, and finally to Congress, which is the final canvasser of the votes. Election protests are handled by the Supreme Court, when it sits as the Presidential Electoral Tribunal.

Timeline
The COMELEC-mandated election period for this election was from January 10 to June 9

2008 

 August 26 - Then-Metro Manila Development Authority Chairman Bayani Fernando announces bid for presidency.
 September 4 - Senator Manny Villar announces bid for presidency.
 November 11 - Makati Mayor Jejomar Binay announces bid for presidency.
 November 26 - Senator Manuel Roxas is elected as party president of the Liberal Party and is nominated to be the standard-bearer.

2009 

 March 12 - Former Defense Secretary Gilbert Teodoro Jr. announces bid for presidency.
 April 25 - Senator Richard Gordon announces bid for presidency.
 May 12 - Senator Panfilo Lacson announces bid for presidency.
 June 6 - Senator Lacson withdraws from presidential race.
 June 17 - Environmentalist Nicanor Perlas announces bid for presidency.
 July 14 - Senator Loren Legarda announces bid for presidency.
 July 31 - Senator Jamby Madrigal announces bid for presidency.
 August 1 - Former Philippine President Corazon Aquino dies from colorectal cancer. The country descends into a five-day period of mourning and grief for the late President.
 August 21 - Evangelist Eddie Villanueva announces bid for presidency.
 August 30 - Ang Kapatiran names Olongapo City councilor John Carlos de los Reyes as its standard-bearer.
 September 1 - Senator Roxas withdraws and supports fellow Senator Benigno Aquino III.; Jejomar Binay withdraws and supports Former President Joseph Estrada.
 September 4 - Pampanga Governor Ed Panlilio and Isabela Governor Grace Padaca withdraws and supports Aquino.
 September 9 - Senator Benigno Aquino III announces bid for presidency.
 September 21 - Liberal Party completes tandem: Roxas accepts vice presidential offer of Aquino.
 September 26 - Ousted President Joseph Estrada announces bid for presidency
 October 23 - Interior and Local Government Secretary Ronaldo Puno withdraws vice presidential bid.
 October 24 - Legarda slides to vice president.
 October 28 - Amid pressures to run for president, Senator Francis Joseph G. Escudero leaves NPC
 November 13 - Lakas-Kampi-CMD completes tandem: TV personality Edu Manzano runs for vice president with Teodoro.
 November 16 - Nacionalista Party completes tandem: Villar picks Legarda for Vice President.
 November 19 - Lakas-Kampi-CMD National Convention nominates Teodoro and Manzano.
 November 23 - De los Reyes and Dominador Chipeco, Jr. (Ang Kapatiran) file certificates of candidacy for president and VP, respectively.
 November 24 - Senator Escudero withdraws from the presidential race 
 November 26 - Supreme Court allows "early campaigning".
 November 28 - Aquino and Roxas (Liberal Party) file Certificates of Candidacy.
 November 29 - Nicanor Perlas (Independent) files certificate of candidacy for president.
Hermogenes Ebdane withdraws presidential bid 
 December 1–2  Teodoro and Manzano (Lakas-Kampi-CMD) file Certificates of Candidacy for President and Vce President, respectively. file; Jamby Madrigal (Independent) files for president alone ; Gordon and Fernando (Bagumbayan-VNP); Jose Sonza (KBL) files for vice president.
 December 2 - ANC Presidential Forum: Analysts and viewers say Aquino gave "strong performance" and sounded "credible" (42%). Teodoro close second (37%); flip-flops on Reproductive Health Bill position.  Villar was absent.
 December 11 - Outgoing Vice President Noli De Castro endorses Roxas for vice president.
 December 15 - Commission on Elections releases list of 16 approved candidates for president and vice-president.
 December 21 - Perlas protests disqualification at COMELEC.
 December 28 - COMELEC hears appeal and petition of disqualified candidates.
 December 21–22 - Pulse Asia Dec 2009 polls: Aquino solidifies lead in(45%) and BW-SWS (46%) presidential surveys. Legarda (37%) and Roxas (39%) are statistically tied in first place for the Pulse Asia vice-presidency survey.

2010

Election period 

 January 10 - Social Weather Stations December 2009 Survey (Zamora commissioned): Villar (33%) cuts Aquino (44%) lead.
 January 14 - Perlas reinstated by COMELEC. Relatively unknown Vetellano Acosta (KBL) is also reinstated as a candidate.
 January 14 - GMA Network Vice-Presidential Forum.
 January 20 - Estrada is allowed to run after the COMELEC threw out all three disqualification cases against him.
 January 29 - De La Salle University and ANC 2010 Presidential Youth Forum Youth 2010: Audience members say Aquino, Gordon, Teodoro "made a favorable impression". Madrigal attends for the first time.  Estrada absent.
 February 8 - The Inquirer 1st Edition Presidential Debate with all candidates attending except Acosta and Estrada, with the latter citing "bias" against him.
 February 9 - Official election campaign starts 
 February 9 - Campaign kickoff rallies occur at Antipolo (Lakas-Kampi-CMD), Calamba (NP), Imus (Bagumbayan-VNP), Olongapo (Ang Kapatiran), Quiapo (PMP), Rizal Park (Bangon Pilipinas Party), and Tarlac (Liberal Party).
 March 4 - COMELEC disqualifies Vetellano Acosta. His name, however, would remain in the ballot although votes that would be cast for him will be considered invalid.
 March 21 - ABS-CBN and ANC Vice-Presidential Debate: Analysts and viewers say that Roxas is seen as "most credible candidate" (54%) with Binay, Fernando tie in second (13%) and Yasay (11%); Legarda fared poorly (4%). Absent was Chipeco and Manzano whose absence drew comments on social-networking sites. Analysts point out also not "to belittle" the underdogs and praised Binay, Yasay and Sonza.
 March 28 - A number of Lakas-Kampi-CMD stalwarts leave party to support Villar. The Liberal Party says these defections are "completing the Villarroyo [Villar-Arroyo] puzzle".  Malacañang downplays defections and denies alliance with Villar.
 March 30 - Teodoro resigns as Lakas-Kampi-CMD Chairman to focus on campaign. This fuels further speculation that President Arroyo is dropping her financial support for her party in exchange of new support in  Villar due to "winnability". Sarangani Governor and party president Miguel Dominguez and secretary-general Francis Manglapus follows in less than 24 hours.  Malacañang denies speculations that the resignations have something to do with rumors that Pres. Arroyo has decided to support another presidential candidate.
 April 6 - Pulse Asia March 2010 survey: Villar (25%) falls 4 points as Aquino (37%) widens lead. According to Pulse Asia, this was mainly due to the Villarroyo issue. This came at the heels of talks that Villar is the "secret candidate" of Pres. Arroyo, a charge that he denies.
 April 10 – May 10 – Overseas absentee voting continuing until May 10 (Election day). Two polling precincts encountered technical problems in Hong Kong, raising concerns on the automation system.
 April 28 – 30 – Local absentee voting for government officials, teachers performing election duties outside of their precincts, members of the Armed Forces of the Philippines (AFP) and operatives of the Philippine National Police (PNP) starts.
 April 29 – COMELEC rejects proposals of a parallel manual count aside from the official tabulation.
 First Week of May - Smartmatic-TIM recalls the Compact Flash Cards (CFC) of all Precinct Count Optical Scanner (PCOS) Machines due to the machines not counting the votes correctly due to the spacing of the ballot. These were found out after testing. By Election Day, 99% of all CF Cards were already delivered. The remaining 1% was due to some inaccessible precincts.
 May 2 – Kingdom of Jesus Christ leader Pastor Apollo Quiboloy finally endorses Gilbert Teodoro for president. and Mar Roxas for vice president
 May 3 - Manila Standard Today Presidential Survey: Aquino leads with Estrada overtaking Villar. 
 May 5 - Iglesia ni Cristo endorses the tandem of Benigno Aquino III and Mar Roxas (Liberal Party). Voting as a block, the INC has an estimated command votes of 5-8 million.
 May 8 – The Supreme Court junks petitions to postpone the elections due to the technical difficulties found with the issue of the CF Cards 
 May 10 — Election Day
 May 10 –  COMELEC extends the voting hours until 7 pm.
 May 11 – After initial election results, De los Reyes, Gordon, Teodoro, Villar and Villanueva conceded defeat to Aquino in the presidential race while Estrada says he won't concede and will wait for the congressional canvass. Chipeco, Legarda, Manzano and Yasay conceded defeat in the vice presidential race.
 May 25 – Congress approves the rules for the canvassing of the Certificates of Canvass for the presidential and vice-presidential positions.
 May 26 – The National Board of Canvassers through the Joint Canvassing Committee composed of evenly of both the Senate and the House of Representatives convene.
 May 28 – Canvassing finally starts with the first certificate of canvass (COC) from Laos to be opened.
 May 31 - June 4 - The issue of null votes i.e. overvotes, undervotes, abstentions, were raised by the Aquino-Roxas Bantay Balota (Aquino and Roxas Ballot Watch). COMELEC, however, stated that the rule on null votes is equivalent on the rule on stray votes before automation, thus  the rules on stray or null votes would apply even if votes were manually counted in an electoral protest.
 June 4 - Several municipalities which declared failure of Elections on May 10 hold rescheduled elections. These were mostly in Lanao del Sur.
 June 8 – Canvassing ends with Aquino (15,208,678) and Binay (14,645,574) winning the presidential and vice presidential elections.
 June 9 – In a speedy deliberation in a public session, the Congress approves the report of the Joint Committee officially proclaiming Aquino and Binay the winners. Through a speech read by his son Senator Jinggoy Estrada, Estrada concedes and promises to support Aquino.
 June 9 - Congress proclaims Senator Benigno Aquino III as president-elect and Makati Mayor Jejomar Binay as vice president-elect of the Republic of the Philippines.

Post-election period 

 June 30 - Aquino and Binay inaugurated as president and vice president of the Philippines.
 July 10 – Roxas files an electoral protest against Binay at the Presidential Electoral Tribunal (PET). Binay's camp shrugged off the protest and says that tribunal will "uphold his victory".
 July 12 – The Presidential Electoral Tribunal (PET) declares the electoral protest of Roxas "sufficient in form and substance". The PET issues summons to Binay to respond to the protest within ten days.

Candidates 
In the Philippines, the multi-party system is implemented. Sometimes a coalition of different parties are made. Notable this year is the Pwersa ng Masang Pilipino–PDP–Laban and Nacionalista Party–NPC coalitions. Each party hosts candidates who go through a process to determine the presidential nominee for that party.

The Commission on Elections released its list of 16 approved candidates for president and vice-president on December 15. One disqualified candidate, Perlas, was reinstated.

This is arranged by the presidential candidates' surname.

Opinion polls

The Philippines has two primary opinion polling companies: Social Weather Stations (SWS) and Pulse Asia.

For president 
Plotted as a 3-period moving average of the surveys.

For vice president 
Plotted as a 3-period moving average of the surveys.

Exit poll
SWS conducted an exit poll. SWS's 2004 exit poll missed by a large margin the result.

According to the SWS exit poll, 45% of Muslims voted for Binay, while only 17% chose Roxas and 28% for Legarda. About 75% of the members of the Iglesia ni Cristo voted for Roxas. Despite having the endorsement of several Catholic bishops, de los Reyes only got 0.2% of the Catholic vote, while Aquino, despite being branded by some Catholic organizations as not pro-life, got 44%.

President

Vice President

Results
The candidate in each position with the highest number of votes is declared the winner; there is no runoff. Congress shall canvass the votes in joint public session.

When there are two or more candidates who have the highest and an equal number of votes, Congress, voting separately via majority vote will choose from these candidates, who have the highest and equal number of votes, who is to be the president.

The Supreme Court shall "be the sole judge of all contests relating to the election, returns, and qualifications of the President or Vice President".

There are several parallel tallies, with the Congressional canvass the official tally. The COMELEC used the election returns from the polling precincts; the Congress as the national board of canvassers will base their official tally from the certificates of canvass from the provinces and cities, which were derived from the election returns. The accredited citizen's arm, the Parish Pastoral Council for Responsible Voting (PPCRV) also used the election returns from the polling precincts. In theory, all tallies must be identical.

For president

Congress in joint session as the National Board of Canvassers convened in the Batasang Pambansa Complex in Quezon City, the home of the House of Representatives. Only a committee canvassed the votes, with the same number of members from both the Senate and the House of Representatives.

On June 8, Congress finished canvassing all of the votes, with the final canvass showing that Aquino and Binay had won. Aquino and Binay were proclaimed as president-elect and vice president-elect in a joint session on June 9. The president-elect and vice president-elect were inaugurated on June 30, 2010. Aquino, son of the 11th president Corazon Aquino, became the second child of a former president to become president themselves after his immediate predecessor Gloria Macapagal Arroyo, whose father was the 9th president Diosdado Macapagal.

In case a president has not been determined by June 30, the vice president-elect shall act as president until a president has been determined. If both positions have not yet been determined, the President of the Senate, or the Speaker of the House of Representatives if the former is unable to do so, shall act as president. Congress shall enact a law on who acts as president if neither of the officials already stated are unable to do so.

By region

For vice president

The candidate with the highest number of votes wins the vice presidency. In case when two or more candidates have the highest number of votes, one of them shall be chosen by the vote of a majority of all the members of both Houses of the Congress, voting separately.

By region

Close provinces/cities 

Margin of victory is less than 5% for the presidential election:
Guimaras: 0.08% (Nacionalista win)
Lanao del Norte: 0.31% (Liberal win)
Nueva Vizcaya: 1.20% (PMP win)
San Juan: 1.53% (Liberal win)
Abra: 1.99% (PMP win)
Sulu: 3.33% (Liberal win)
Palawan: 3.35% (PMP win)
Cagayan: 3.78% (PMP win)
Agusan del Sur: 4.85% (Liberal win)

Margin of victory is less than 5% for the vice presidential election:
Ilocos Sur: 0.48% (Liberal win)
Absentee voters: 0.64% (Liberal win)
Marinduque: 2.07% (Liberal win)
Palawan: 2:30% (PDP-Laban)
South Cotabato: 3.36% (PDP-Laban win)
Zamboanga del Norte: 3.82% (Liberal win)
Albay: 4.07% (Liberal win)
Agusan del Norte: 4.44% (Liberal win)
Quezon: 4.54% (PDP-Laban win)
Zamboanga City: 4.62% (PDP-Laban win)
Camarines Norte: 4.72% (PDP-Laban win)

Unofficial tallies

COMELEC
The COMELEC originally released results for president and vice president based from election returns but stopped in order not to preempt Congress. The COMELEC held their tally at the Philippine International Convention Center in Pasay.

PPCRV
The PPCRV held their tally at the Pope Pius Center in Manila.

Voter demographics

President

Source: Exit polls conducted by Pulse Asia

Vice President

Source: Exit polls conducted by Pulse Asia

Campaign expenses
According to the Fair Elections Act, the COMELEC's cap on spending is 10 pesos per voter for each candidate and another 5 pesos per voter for one's political party; since there are about 50 million voters, a candidate can spend up to 500 million pesos and a party can spend an additional 250 million pesos.

The following is a list of published campaign expenses; the COMELEC has no ability to confirm if these were true.

See also
Naging Mahirap, Manuel Villar's campaign jingle

Literature

References

External links
Official website of the Commission on Elections
Official Congressional Results
Congressional Canvass Tally Board – Main Site

Partial and Unofficial Results
Philippines 2010 Election Results - Main Site
Philippines 2010 Election Results - Alternate Site
PPCRV Map Viewer - PPCRV Encoded Site
PPCRV Map Viewer - PPCRV Site
NAMFREL - 2010 PARALLEL COUNT - NAMFREL Site
HALALAN 2010: Latest Comelec official results - ABS-CBN Site
ELEKSYON 2010: National Election Results Tally - GMA Site
ELEKSYON 2010: Regional Election Results Tally - GMA Site
Auto-Vote 2010: Presidential Election Results - Hatol ng Bayan Site
Auto-Vote 2010: Vice-Presidential Election Results - Hatol ng Bayan Site
The Vote 2010 Election Results Tally - Bombo Radyo Site

NGOs
 Official website of National Movement for Free Elections (NAMFREL)
Official website of the Parish Pastoral Council for Responsible Voting (PPCRV)

Media websites
Halalan 2010 - Election coverage by ABS-CBN
Eleksyon 2010 - Election coverage by GMA Network	
Pagbabago 2010 - Election coverage by TV5
Hatol ng Bayan Auto Vote 2010 - Election coverage by Government Media Group (NBN, RPN, IBC, PBS, PNA, PIA, BCS)

 
.
2010
2010 elections in the Philippines

ms:Pilihan raya Filipina 2010
pl:Wybory powszechne na Filipinach w 2010 roku